The Tip, sometimes referred to as the Immaculate Deflection, was a play in the 2013 NFC Championship Game in the National Football League between the #5 seeded San Francisco 49ers and the #1 seeded Seattle Seahawks. The game was played in CenturyLink Field (now known as Lumen Field) in Seattle, Washington and, being the NFC Championship Game, was televised nationally on Fox.

With the score 23–17 in favor of the Seahawks, the 49ers had driven the ball all the way to the Seahawks' 18 yard line. With 30 seconds left in regulation, 49ers quarterback Colin Kaepernick threw a pass to Michael Crabtree in the right corner of the endzone. Before Crabtree could catch the ball, cornerback Richard Sherman deflected the ball directly into linebacker Malcolm Smith's hands for an interception, all but sealing the Seahawks victory. With the win, the Seahawks advanced to just their second Super Bowl appearance in franchise history, in which they defeated the Denver Broncos 43–8 for their first Super Bowl win. The Tip is often considered one of the biggest moments in Seattle Seahawks history.

Events of the play
Until the 4th quarter, the Seahawks had not had a lead the entire game. That changed when Seahawks quarterback Russell Wilson threw a 35-yard touchdown pass to Jermaine Kearse with 13:44 left in the game, making the score 20–17. After a 47-yard field goal by Steven Hauschka with 3:37 left, the lead increased to 23–17.

The 49ers moved the ball quickly to the 18 yard line, needing a touchdown and subsequent extra point to retake the lead. With 30 seconds remaining, 49ers quarterback Colin Kaepernick avoided mounting pressure from defensive end Cliff Avril, launching a pass to Michael Crabtree in the right side of the endzone. Before Crabtree could catch the ball, cornerback Richard Sherman leaped into the air and tipped the ball. It promptly landed into the hands of linebacker Malcolm Smith, who took a knee for a Seattle touchback with 22 seconds left in the game.

After the play
After a brief celebration, Sherman ran over to Crabtree and offered his hand for a handshake, but Crabtree shoved Sherman's facemask. Sherman then directed a choke sign at Kaepernick, which earned him an unsportsmanlike conduct flag. Since there was still 22 seconds left, the game continued. Russell Wilson knelt three times, causing the 49ers to burn their last two timeouts, and the game was over.

Richard Sherman's post-game interview
The following is Sherman's now-famous post-game interview with Erin Andrews:

Many considered Sherman's outburst as immature, rude, and disrespectful toward Crabtree and Andrews. Sherman later said in a CNN interview "You know, I don't mean to attack [Crabtree]. And that was immature and I probably shouldn't have done that. I regret doing that."

Name

The play was later dubbed the Immaculate Deflection as a tribute to the Immaculate Reception. The plays were somewhat similar: in both plays, the pass was deflected into a teammate's hand. However, the Immaculate Deflection resulted in an interception, whereas with the Immaculate Reception, it was caught by the offense and run in for a touchdown.

Aftermath
The Seahawks went on to blow out the Denver Broncos 43–8 in Super Bowl XLVIII two weeks later, winning their first Lombardi Trophy in team history. The 49ers, however, did not return to the postseason until 2019, also failing to climb above the .500 mark in terms of their win–loss record in each of the following seasons until 2019. Some credit Sherman's tip with the steady decline of the 49ers. Coincidentally, Sherman joined the 49ers in 2018.

Six days after the Championship game, Sherman was fined $7,875 for his unsportsmanlike conduct penalty toward Kaepernick.

In 2018 in a week 13 matchup between the 49ers and the Seahawks, the Seahawks reenacted Sherman's tip after a 1st quarter touchdown pass. Doug Baldwin played the role of Sherman, tipping the ball to David Moore, who played the role of Malcolm Smith. Jaron Brown played Kaepernick, and Tyler Lockett played Crabtree. Since both Sherman and Smith were currently on the 49ers, it was unsure if it was a tribute to Sherman, or a mockery, especially after Sherman called the Seahawks a middle of the road team prior to the game. The Seahawks won the game 43-16 and officially eliminated the 49ers from playoff contention.

Starting lineups

Officials
Referee: Gene Steratore (114)
Line Judge: Byron Boston (18)
Head Linesman:  Dana McKenzie (8)
Field Judge: Scott Edwards (3)
Umpire: Bill Schuster (129)
Side Judge: Greg Meyer (78)
Back Judge: Perry Paganelli (46)
Replay Official: Paul Weidner

See also
 49ers–Seahawks rivalry
 2013 NFL season
 2013 San Francisco 49ers season
 2013 Seattle Seahawks season

References

Playoffs
NFC Championship Games
Seattle Seahawks postseason
San Francisco 49ers postseason
American football incidents
January 2014 sports events in the United States
2014 in sports in Washington (state)
2014 in Seattle